WTA 500 tournaments is a category of tennis tournaments in the Women's Tennis Association tour, implemented since the reorganization of the schedule in 2021.

As of 2021, WTA 500 tournaments include events with prize money of approximately $500,000.

The ranking points awarded to the winners of these tournaments are 470.

This compares to 2,000 points for winning a Grand Slam tournament ("major"), up to 1,500 points for winning the WTA Finals, 900 or 1000 points for winning a WTA 1000 tournament, and 280 for winning a WTA 250 tournament. This system differs slightly from that used for the men's ATP Tour, which has 13 ATP Tour 500 events with 500 points for the winner (similar to WTA 500 tournaments), and other tiers of ATP tournaments that offer 1000 and 250 points for winning, respectively.

Events

Historic names

1990–2008
WTA Tier II

2009–2020
WTA Premier

2021–present
WTA 500

Singles results

2021

2022

2023

Singles champions

WTA Tier II

WTA Premier

WTA 500

Notes 

The final between  Jana Novotná vs.  Arantxa Sánchez Vicario was abandoned at 6-5 due to rain.
The final between  Martina Hingis vs.  Lindsay Davenport was abandoned due to rain.
The final between  Anett Kontaveit vs.  Ann Li was abandoned due to a delay in schedule.
Competed under no flag due to the Russian invasion of Ukraine.

Statistics

Most titles 

Bold face designates active players

See also
 WTA Tour
 WTA 1000 tournaments
 WTA 250 tournaments
 ITF Women's World Tennis Tour
 WTA Premier tournaments
 WTA International tournaments
 ATP Tour 500

References